Ali Shahalom (born 15 October 1992), also known by his stage name Ali Official, is an English comedian and television presenter of Bangladeshi descent.

Early life
Shahalom was born in Devon, England. He studied drama and theatre at GCSE and A-level. He moved to London to study at university. He then went on to work as a Digital Marketing Assistant for Warner Bros.

Career
Since April 2011, Shahalom and his younger brother, Shaheen (born 2001), host their own channel on YouTube called Aliofficial1 with comedy sketches. Their comedy videos often relate back to their Bengali heritage and culture, and have subsequently attracted a large South-Asian following.

In July 2013, Shahalom appeared on Channel 4's month-long documentary series, Ramadan Diaries. In 2014, he featured in two episodes of comedy web series Corner Shop Show. Since May of the same year, he has hosted The Variety Show on Channel S, broadcast live every fortnight on Saturday at 8.30 pm. In July 2015, he collaborated with Humza Arshad on episode 19 of Badman's World.

In October 2015, he performed on the "Sounds of Light" tour with musicians Safe Adam and Harris J. In December 2015, he went on a 20 city national tour with comedy trio Allah Made Me Funny and Guz Khan. Throughout 2017, Ali worked with BBC to script and star in Snapchat content, which went on to win a Social Buzz Award and a Digiday Award. In February 2017, Ali made a special guest appearance on BBC One's musical show Let It Shine.  In March 2017, Ali helped the social media planning for Channel 4's documentary Extremely British Muslims. In April 2017, he did four shows across the United States. In May 2017, Ali performed at the West Yorkshire Playhouse for BBC Asian Network's Comedy Night.

Recognition
In October 2016, Shahalom was named one of the "Young British Muslim Millennials Changing The World" by The Asian Today.

See also
 British Bangladeshi
 List of British Bangladeshis

References

1992 births
21st-century Bengalis
21st-century English male actors
Alumni of the University of Westminster
British Internet celebrities
Comedians from Devon
English film directors
English male comedians
English male web series actors
English people of Bangladeshi descent
English Sunni Muslims
English television presenters
English video bloggers
English YouTubers
Living people
Male actors from Devon
Muslim male comedians